Letcombe Regis is a village and civil parish in the Vale of White Horse. It was part of Berkshire until the 1974 boundary changes transferred the Vale of White Horse to Oxfordshire. The 2011 Census recorded the parish population as 578.

History
The parish includes Segsbury Camp, an Iron Age hill fort on the crest of the Downs just over a mile south of the village.  The Domesday Book of 1086 records Letcombe Regis. The name may come from the Old English Ledecumbe meaning the "lede in the combe" – i.e. "the brook in the valley." 
"Regis" may derive from the Latin 'rex' meaning 'Royal' with 'Regis' meaning The King's, giving, perhaps, "The Kings brook in the valley."

Parish church
The Church of England parish church of Saint Andrew is a Grade II* listed building.  St Andrew's parish is part of the Ridgeway Benefice, along with the parishes of Childrey, Kingston Lisle, Letcombe Bassett, Sparsholt and West Challow.

Amenities

Letcombe Regis has a public house, the Greyhound Inn and a village hall.

See also
Regis (Place)
List of place names with royal patronage in the United Kingdom

References

Bibliography

External links

Letcombe Regis Parish Council

Civil parishes in Oxfordshire
Vale of White Horse
Villages in Oxfordshire